Pool A of the 2022 Billie Jean King Cup Asia/Oceania Zone Group I was the only pool in the Asia/Oceania zone of the 2020–21 Billie Jean King Cup. Six teams competed in a round robin competition, with the top placing teams advancing to the 2022 Billie Jean King Cup Play-offs.

Standings 

Standings are determined by: 1. number of wins; 2. number of matches; 3. in two-team ties, head-to-head records; 4. in three-team ties, (a) percentage of matches won (head-to-head records if two teams remain tied), then (b) percentage of sets won (head-to-head records if two teams remain tied), then (c) percentage of games won (head-to-head records if two teams remain tied), then (d) Billie Jean King Cup rankings.

Round-robin

Japan vs. India

China vs. New Zealand

South Korea vs. Indonesia

Japan vs. Indonesia

China vs. India

South Korea vs. New Zealand

Japan vs. New Zealand

China vs. South Korea

India vs. Indonesia

Japan vs. South Korea

China vs. Indonesia

India vs. New Zealand

Japan vs. China

South Korea vs. India

Indonesia vs. New Zealand

References

External links 
 Fed Cup website

2022 Billie Jean King Cup Asia/Oceania Zone